The Hawker Harrier was an experimental biplane torpedo bomber aircraft built by Hawker Aircraft to a specification issued in the 1920s  for the RAF.

Development
In 1925, the British Air Ministry laid down specifications for a high altitude bomber to replace the Hawker Horsley and for a coastal torpedo bomber (Specifications 23/25 and 24/25). As these specifications were similar, the Air Ministry announced that a single competition would be held to study aircraft submitted for both specifications.

Sydney Camm of Hawker Aircraft designed the Harrier to meet the requirements of Specification 23/25, with the prototype (J8325) first flying in February 1927, the first of the competitors for the two specifications to fly. The Harrier was a two-seat biplane with single-bay wings powered by a geared Bristol Jupiter VIII radial engine.

The prototype Harrier was tested at the Aeroplane and Armament Experimental Establishment (A & AEE) at Martlesham Heath in November 1927, where, while it met the requirements of Specification 23/25 and had satisfactory handling, the geared engine meant that it was underpowered, and it had an inferior bombload to the Hawker Horsley, the aircraft it was meant to replace. It was therefore modified to carry a torpedo. On testing the modified aircraft, however, it was found to still be underpowered, being incapable of taking off with a torpedo, gunner and full fuel load. It was therefore not considered further, the competition ultimately being won by the Vickers Vildebeest.

The prototype was used by Bristol as an engine testbed, flying with the  Bristol Hydra and the  Bristol Orion engines.

Specifications (Harrier, as bomber)

See also

References
Notes

Bibliography

External links

Hawker Harrier – British Aircraft Directory

1920s British bomber aircraft
Harrier
Single-engined tractor aircraft
Biplanes
Aircraft first flown in 1927